Sir Malachy Bowes Daly  (February 6, 1836 – April 26, 1920) was a Canadian politician and the seventh Lieutenant Governor of Nova Scotia.

Early life
Born in Quebec City, the son of Sir Dominick Daly, he was called to the bar in Halifax, Nova Scotia in 1864.

Political and administrative career
Daly was a private secretary to his father and to three governors of Nova Scotia: Sir Richard Graves MacDonnell, Sir Charles Hastings Doyle, and Sir William Fenwick Williams.

He was elected to the House of Commons of Canada in the riding of Halifax in the 1878 federal election. A Liberal-Conservative, he was re-elected in the 1882 elections. From 1885 to 1887, he was the Deputy Speaker and Chairman of Committees of the Whole of the House of Commons. From 1890 to 1900 he was the lieutenant-governor of Nova Scotia. In the New Year Honours list January 1900, he was knighted as a Knight Commander of the Order of St Michael and St George (KCMG).

Outside politics, he was also a cricketer, playing twice for the Canada national cricket team in 1874. He also scored the first century in Canadian cricket in Halifax during the 1858 cricket season.

Family
At Halifax, July 4, 1859, he married Joanna Kenny, second daughter of Sir Edward Kenny, a cabinet minister in the Sir John A. Macdonald government. On retiring from the Governorship, he, Lady Daly and their daughter, Miss Daly, were honoured by public testimonials. He was given a magnificent dressing case; Lady Daly was given a diamond star pendant and Miss Daly was given a diamond ring. Lady Daly served as a volunteer and as President of the Ladies' Auxiliary in connection with the Mission to Deep Sea Fisheries. She was an amateur actress, and performed at Government House in Nova Scotia.

Electoral history

References

Sources

External links
 

1836 births
1920 deaths
Canadian Knights Commander of the Order of St Michael and St George
Canadian King's Counsel
Conservative Party of Canada (1867–1942) MPs
Lieutenant Governors of Nova Scotia
Members of the House of Commons of Canada from Nova Scotia
Politicians from Quebec City
Sportspeople from Quebec City
Cricketers from Quebec
Anglophone Quebec people
Canadian sportsperson-politicians